Yersiniosis is an infectious disease caused by a bacterium of the genus Yersinia.  In the United States, most yersiniosis infections among humans are caused by Yersinia enterocolitica. 

Infection with  Y. enterocolitica occurs most often in young children. The infection is thought to be contracted through the consumption of undercooked meat products, unpasteurized milk, or water contaminated by the bacteria. It has been also sometimes associated with handling raw chitterlings. 

Another bacterium of the same genus, Yersinia pestis, is the cause of Plague.

Signs and symptoms 
Infection with Y. enterocolitica can cause a variety of symptoms depending on the age of the person infected. Common symptoms in children are fever, abdominal pain, and diarrhea, which is often bloody. Symptoms typically develop 4 to 7 days after exposure and may last 1 to 3 weeks or longer. In older children and adults, right-sided abdominal pain and fever may be the predominant symptoms, and may be confused with appendicitis. In a small proportion of cases, complications such as skin rash, joint pains, ileitis, erythema nodosum, and sometimes sepsis, acute arthritis or the spread of bacteria to the bloodstream (bacteremia) can occur.

Diagnosis
Phage typing of bacterial culture or antibodies for F-antigen.

Treatment
Treatment for gastroenteritis due to Y. enterocolitica is not needed in the majority of cases. Severe infections with systemic involvement (sepsis or bacteremia) often requires aggressive antibiotic therapy; the drugs of choice are doxycycline and an aminoglycoside. Alternatives include cefotaxime, fluoroquinolones, and co-trimoxazole.

References

External links 

Bacterial diseases